Hollywood is an unincorporated community in Monroe County, West Virginia, United States. Hollywood is northeast of Union.

The community was so named on account of holly bushes near the original town site.

References

Unincorporated communities in Monroe County, West Virginia
Unincorporated communities in West Virginia